Gurruchaga is a Spanish form of Basque surname  . Notable people with the surname include:

Emilio Gurruchaga (born 1934), Spanish sailor
José Ramón Gurruchaga Ezama (1931–2017), Peruvian Roman Catholic bishop
Juan José Gurruchaga (born 1977), Chilean actor
Itziar Gurrutxaga
Zuhaitz Gurrutxaga